Shahrak-e Fajr may refer to:
 Shahrak-e Fajr, Fars
 Shahrak-e Fajr, Ilam
 Shahrak-e Fajr, Khuzestan